The Toronto Maple Leafs are a professional ice hockey team based in Toronto, Ontario. They are members of the Atlantic Division in the Eastern Conference of the National Hockey League (NHL) and are known as one of the Original Six teams of the league. Founded in 1917, the club had no nickname in their first season, and were known as the Toronto Arenas for their second season. From the 1919–20 season they were known as the Toronto St. Patricks, until in February 1927 when the club was purchased by Conn Smythe. Smythe changed the name of the club to the Maple Leafs and they have been known by that name ever since. Over their 104 seasons, the Leafs have won 3000 regular season games, lost over 2800 regular season games, accumulated six division championships, led the league in points six times, appeared in the playoffs 71 times, gained eight O'Brien Cup championships, and won 13 Stanley Cup titles.

Table key

Year by year

All-time records

Notes

See also
 List of Toronto Hockey Club seasons

References

External links
 Toronto Maple Leafs official website

 
seasons
Toronto Maple Leafs